The 2011 BMW Open, also known as The BMW Open by FWU Takaful 2011 for sponsorship reasons, was a men's tennis tournament played on outdoor clay courts. It was the 96th edition of the event. It was part of the ATP World Tour 250 series of the 2011 ATP World Tour. It took place at the MTTC Iphitos complex in Munich, Germany, from 23 April through 1 May 2011. Mikhail Youzhny was the defending champion, while he was joined by last year's finalist Marin Čilić as well as semifinalists Marcos Baghdatis and Philipp Petzschner. Unranked former world number two countryman Tommy Haas made his 2011 debut and returned to playing in doubles via a wildcard into the main draw with partner Radek Štěpánek.

Entrants

Seeds

 Seedings are based on the rankings of April 18, 2011.

Other entrants
The following players received wildcards into the main draw:
  Matthias Bachinger
  Andreas Beck
  Dustin Brown

The following players received entry from the qualifying draw:

  Steve Darcis
  Robert Farah
  Andrey Kuznetsov
  Julian Reister

The following player received entry from a Lucky loser spot:
  Denis Gremelmayr

Notable withdrawals
  Jarkko Nieminen

Finals

Singles

 Nikolay Davydenko defeated  Florian Mayer, 6–3, 3–6, 6–1
It was Davydenko's 1st title of the year and 21st of his career. It was his 2nd win in Munich, also winning in 2004.

Doubles

 Simone Bolelli /  Horacio Zeballos defeated  Andreas Beck /  Christopher Kas, 7–6(3), 6–4

References

External links
 Official website

 
2011 BMW Open
BMW Open
April 2011 sports events in Germany
May 2011 sports events in Germany